Whiteclosegate is a hamlet in the Carlisle district of the county of Cumbria, England.

Location 
It is on the B6264 road. Nearby settlements include the city of Carlisle, the villages of Houghton and Rickerby, the hamlets of Linstock and Tarraby and the residential areas of Kingstown and Moorville.

Transport 
For transport, in addition to the B6264, the A689 road, A595 road, A69 road and A6 road and the M6 motorway are nearby. There is also Carlisle railway station about a mile and a half away.

References 

 A-Z Carlisle (page 16)

Hamlets in Cumbria
City of Carlisle